Austria competed at the 1956 Summer Olympics in Melbourne, Australia and Stockholm, Sweden (equestrian events). 29 competitors, 24 men and 5 women, took part in 33 events in 11 sports.

Medalists

Athletics

Men's marathon 
Adolf Gruber — 2:46:20 (→ 23rd place)

Cycling
Men's 1.000m Time Trial 
Kurt Schein — 1:13.1 (→ 11th place)

Men's 4.000m Team Pursuit
Rudolf MareschFranz WimmerKurt ScheinWalter Bortel — 10th place

Men's Individual Road Race 
Franz Wimmer — 5:27:28 (→ 30th place)
Walter Bortel — did not finish (→ no ranking)
Kurt Schein — did not finish (→ no ranking)
Rudolf Maresch — did not finish (→ no ranking)

Boxing

Canoeing

Cycling

Four male cyclists represented Austria in 1956.

Individual road race
 Franz Wimmer
 Walter Bortel
 Rudolf Maresch
 Kurt Schein

Team road race
 Franz Wimmer
 Walter Bortel
 Rudolf Maresch
 Kurt Schein

Time trial
 Kurt Schein

Team pursuit
 Franz Wimmer
 Walter Bortel
 Rudolf Maresch
 Kurt Schein

Diving

Women's 10m platform
Eva Pfarrhofer 
 Preliminary Round — 46.02 (→ did not advance, 13th place)

Fencing

One fencer represented Austria in 1956.

Women's foil
 Ellen Müller-Preis

Gymnastics

Rowing

Austria had four male rowers participate in three out of seven rowing events in 1956.

 Men's single sculls
 Ferdinand Rabeder

 Men's coxless pair
 Alfred Sageder
 Josef Kloimstein

 Men's coxed pair
 Josef Kloimstein
 Alfred Sageder
 Franz König

Sailing

Open

Weightlifting

Wrestling

References

External links
Official Olympic Reports
International Olympic Committee results database

Nations at the 1956 Summer Olympics
1956
Summer Olympics